Allmania is a genus of flowering plants belonging to the family Amaranthaceae. Its native range is Southern China to Tropical Asia.

Species

Allmania multiflora

Allmania multiflora is an annual herb.  
It is only the second species of this genus identified so far.
It has been so named for having a higher number of florets within an inflorescence.
The species was discovered during ongoing studies on Amaranthaceae, the plant family to which the genus Allmania belongs. it is distinct from nodiflora, which so far had been accepted as the lone Allmania species.

Allmania nodiflora
Allmania nodiflora

References

Amaranthaceae
Amaranthaceae genera